Saint Monica's Church may refer to:

In the United Kingdom:
 Church of St. Monica, Bootle, Merseyside

In the United States:
 Saint Monica's Church, Barre, Vermont
 St. Monica Catholic Church (Santa Monica, California)
 St. Monica's Church (Queens, New York), New York
 St. Monica's Church (Manhattan), New York City